Viets Hotel was an 1876 vernacular Greek Revival building in Grand Forks, North Dakota. In proceeding years it had been the Richardson House (by 1884), a subdivided residence (by 1896), the Hall Hotel (from around 1906 until at least 1938), Hotel Apartments (1940), Hall Apartments (1942–88), and Bachellor Apartments (1989–97).

The listing was proposed in a 1981 study of Downtown Grand Forks historical resources., and it was listed on the National Register of Historic Places in 1982.

The structure was heavily damaged after the 1997 Red River flood and destroyed by fire in 2000. The location is now occupied by a dike. It was officially delisted from the National Register in 2018.

See also
 Building at 317 S. 3rd St., which sometimes housed overflow hotel patrons

References

Hotel buildings on the National Register of Historic Places in North Dakota
Greek Revival architecture in North Dakota
Vernacular architecture in North Dakota
Hotel buildings completed in 1876
Burned hotels in the United States
National Register of Historic Places in Grand Forks, North Dakota
Demolished buildings and structures in North Dakota
Buildings and structures demolished in 1997
Buildings and structures destroyed by flooding
1997 disestablishments in North Dakota
1997 Red River flood